Empires Airlines was an airline that merged with Zimmerly Air Lines in 1946 to form West Coast Airlines. West Coast Airlines later merged with two other airlines to form Hughes Airwest in 1968. In 1980 Hughes Airwest was acquired by Republic Airlines, which was acquired in 1986 by Northwest Airlines. Northwest Airlines was approved to merge with Delta Air Lines on October 29, 2008.

In 1946 Empires Airlines began flying Boeing 247 from Spokane to Idaho Falls and back, with eleven stops. It merged into West Coast Airlines in 1952.

See also 
 List of defunct airlines of the United States

References

Defunct airlines of the United States